Katie Eder (born   ) is an American activist and social entrepreneur who founded and has led social impact ventures 50 Miles More, Kids Tales, and The Future Coalition, the latter where she is currently the Executive Director.

In December 2019, Eder was named one of Forbes 30 under 30 in Law and Policy.

Early life and education 
Eder was born and raised in Milwaukee, Wisconsin. Katie graduated from Shorewood High School in 2018 and started at Stanford University in the fall of 2020. She is the youngest of five children.

Activism

Kids Tales 
When Katie was 13 years old, she founded a nonprofit organization, Kids Tales, to bring creative writing workshops, taught by teens, to kids who do not have access to writing experiences outside of school. During a Kids Tales workshop, kids write a short story that is published in an anthology, a real book. Fifteen hundred kids in nine countries have participated in Kids Tales workshops. Kids Tales has engaged over 400 teen teachers and published 90 anthologies.

50 Miles More 
After the 2018 March For Our Lives events ended on March 24, Katie and other students from her high school organized a 50 mile march from Madison, WI to Janesville, WI, the hometown of former U.S. Speaker of the House Paul Ryan, to call him out for his role in blocking and burying gun legislation. This 50 Miles More march lead Katie and her team to launch a nationwide campaign called #50more in #50states to challenge the other 49 states to hold 50 Mile Marches to the hometown or office of one of their NRA-backed elected officials to demand they take action to end gun violence. 50 Miles More did 50 mile walk in Massachusetts in August 2018. 50 Miles More also innovated a nationwide youth-led voter engagement initiative targeting these newly engaged marchers to get them to the polls to vote in the 2018 midterm elections.

Future Coalition 
Katie led 50 Miles More to forge alliances with other youth-led organizations across the country to form the Future Coalition, a national network and community for young people and youth-led organizations with the goal of making the future a better, safer, and more just place for everyone. The Future Coalition connects youth-led organizations and youth leaders across the United States to share resources and ideas. The Future Coalition launched in September 2018 with the election campaign Walkout to Vote. Over 500 schools across the country walked out of class and marched to the polls.

Honors and awards 

 Prudential Spirit of Community Award – National Honoree
 Diller Tikkun Olam Award
 Three Dot Dash – Global Social Entrepreneurship Incubator – Just Peace Summit
 International Literacy Association – 30 under 30 Award
 AFS-USA Project Change – Vision in Action Award

References 

Living people
Year of birth missing (living people)
People from Milwaukee
Organization founders
American gun control activists
Activists from Wisconsin
American child activists
20th-century births
Shorewood High School (Wisconsin) alumni
Youth climate activists
21st-century American women